German recording artist Cassandra Steen has released four studio albums and twelve singles. Steen began her career as lead vocalist of pop trio Glashaus. She released her first solo album, Seele mit Herz (2004), during the hiatus of the band on band member Moses Pelham's 3–P label. It reached the top sixty of the German Albums Chart and produced the singles "Wie du lachst" and "Alles was du willst", both of which failed to chart or sell noticeably.

After her departure from Glashaus, Steen signed a recording contract with Universal Urban and released her second album Darum leben wir in 2009. It entered the top ten in Germany and was eventually certified gold by the Bundesverband Musikindustrie (BVMI). Its singles "Darum leben wir" and "Stadt" both became top ten hits, the latter of which went platinum in Germany. Steen's third album Mir so nah debuted at number five on the German Albums Chart and produced the singles "Gebt alles" and "Tanz". Her fourth record, Spiegelbild (2014), overseen by singer Tim Bendzko and musician Christian "Crada" Kalla, was less successful than its predecessors and peaked at number 42 on the German Albums Chart only. Its first and only single "Gewinner" failed to chart.

Albums

Studio albums

Singles

As a main artist

As a featured artist

Album appearances

Music videos

References

External links 

  Cassandra-Steen.de — official site

Discographies of German artists